Warnick is a surname. Notable people with the surname include:

 Angela Warnick Buchdahl (born 1972), American rabbi
 Judith Warnick (born 1950), American politician
 Karl Foster Warnick, American engineer
 Kim Warnick (born 1959), American rock musician
 Spencer K. Warnick (1874-1954), American politician